Richard Charles Shinske (May 31, 1955 – October 23, 2012) was a Canadian professional ice hockey forward who played 63 games in the National Hockey League for the Cleveland Barons and St. Louis Blues. Shinske played for the New Westminster Bruins of the WHL. He is the son of Ernie 'Punch" McLean's longtime partner and former general manager of the Estevan Bruins, Bill Shinske. He died of cancer in 2012. He was survived by his wife Janice, son, Grady and daughter, Bailey.

Career statistics

Regular season and playoffs

External links
 

1955 births
2012 deaths
Adirondack Red Wings players
Binghamton Dusters players
Calgary Centennials players
California Golden Seals draft picks
Canadian ice hockey centres
Cleveland Barons (NHL) players
Edmonton Oilers (WHA) draft picks
Ice hockey people from Saskatchewan
New Haven Nighthawks players
New Westminster Bruins players
Phoenix Roadrunners (CHL) players
Salt Lake Golden Eagles (CHL) players
Sportspeople from Weyburn
St. Louis Blues players